The sipsi is a clarinet-like, single-reed instrument used mainly in folk music and native to the Aegean region of Greece and Turkey. The word sipsi is possibly onomatopoeic. In ancient Greece, it was known as kalamavlos (καλάμαυλος), meaning cane-flute. The sipsi can be made of bone, wood, or reed, though the reed variant is most common.  Its size varies from region to region, but it generally contains five finger holes in the front, and one finger hole in the back.

The sipsi is one of many reed instruments in Turkey used to play lead melodies in instrumental folk music. It is generally played in the Western part  in the Aegean Region of Turkey. Most folk tunes played in this area with the sipsi are in 9/8 time.

Playing
The timbre of the sipsi is similar to that of the Irish bagpipe. Players of the sipsi employ the circular breathing method, in which air is breathed through the nose while it is being pumped out of stored air in the cheeks. This breathing method is used to form an uninterrupted sound.

To tune the sipsi, one must wrap a thread around the bottom of the reed, which is placed into the main body of the instrument. Adjusting the reed with the string is the way to tune. The instrument's range is greater than its six finger holes would suggest, the upper registers can be attained by particular approach to breathing.

See also
Clarinet
Diplica
Dili tuiduk
Turkish folk music

References

Further reading
 Redhouse Türkçe/Osmanlıca-İngilizce Sözlüğü, 14th edition (1999), Istanbul, Turkey. . Retrieved 2015-12-13.
 Türkçe Sözlük [Turkish Dictionary]. Expanded 7th edition (1983). Türk Dil Kurumu Yayınları [Turkish Language Association Publications], Ankara, Turkey. Retrieved 2015-12-13.

Turkish folk music instruments
Clarinets
Turkish words and phrases
Turkish inventions